Buxus arborea is a species of plant in the family Buxaceae. It is endemic to Jamaica. It is threatened by habitat loss.

Description
Buxus arborea is a dicot plant, growing as shrubs or  trees up to 2-12 meters tall, producing wood. 
Buxus arborea has compound leaves. The leaves are typically alternate on stems. 
Its fruits are very small capsules, 0.5 cm-1.5 cm wide, containing tiny seeds that are eaten by birds.

Uses
Buxus Arborea can be used for wood carving, and for hedge structures.

Distribution
Buxus Arborea is distributed in the United States (NY, OH, NC, TN, VA).

Toxicity
May cause skin rash, vomiting, or diarrhea if exposed to the leaves.

Cultivation
Buxus Arborea typically like to grow in the outdoors. They grow in warm temperatures predominately.

References

Boxwood (Buxus arborea). garden.org.
Buxus Facts - Photos - Earth's Endangered Creatures
USDA Plants Database. plants.usda.gov.
Buxus 'Green Mountain' (Boxwood, Green Mountain Boxwood) | North Carolina Extension Gardener Plant Toolbox plants.ces.ncsu.edu
https://boxwoodsociety.org/art/abs_downloads/ABS_Checklist_v2_FINAL_sm.pdfboxwoodsociety.org
Buxus arborea Proctor — The Plant List www.theplantlist.org
SEINet Portal Network - Buxus arboreaswbiodiversity.org

arborea
Vulnerable plants
Endemic flora of Jamaica
Taxonomy articles created by Polbot